The Capt. John Foley Horr House is the historic residence of Captain John Foley Horr on the southern portion of Marco Island, Florida. It is located at the north side of Whiskey Creek Drive on Key Marco (formerly known as Horr's Island). On October 8, 1997, the house, used as a residence, was added to the U.S. National Register of Historic Places.

References

External links
Collier County listings at National Register of Historic Places
at

Archaeological sites in Florida
Houses in Collier County, Florida
Houses on the National Register of Historic Places in Florida
National Register of Historic Places in Collier County, Florida